The Sycamore Public Library, in Sycamore, Illinois, was erected in 1905 in the former location of Mansion House, Sycamore's oldest structure. Construction began in May of that year and the library officially opened to the public on Thanksgiving Day, 1905. The library joined the National Register of Historic Places in May 1978 with the rest of the Sycamore Historic District. The library still operates, as of 2019, as the Sycamore library. The library was erected with the help of a $10,000 grant from Andrew Carnegie in 1905.

See also
 Paxton Carnegie Public Library

References

External links

Sycamore Public Library

Library buildings completed in 1905
Public libraries in Illinois
Buildings and structures in Sycamore Historic District
Carnegie libraries in Illinois
Education in DeKalb County, Illinois
Historic district contributing properties in Illinois
Libraries on the National Register of Historic Places in Illinois
1905 establishments in Illinois